Cyperus ossicaulis is a species of sedge that is endemic to an area in central Somalia.

The species was first formally described by the botanist Kåre Arnstein Lye in 1996.

See also
 List of Cyperus species

References

ossicaulis
Plants described in 1996
Flora of Somalia
Taxa named by Kåre Arnstein Lye